The sixth season of Chicago Med, an American medical drama television series with executive producer Dick Wolf, and producers Michael Brandt, Derek Haas, Peter Jankowski, Andrew Schneider and Diane Frolov, was ordered on February 27, 2020. The season premiered on November 11, 2020. This season marks the final appearances of paediatric attending Natalie Manning portrayed by Torrey DeVitto and staff nurse April Sexton portrayed by Yaya DaCosta.

Cast

Main characters 
 Nick Gehlfuss as Dr. Will Halstead, Supervising Attending Emergency Physician
 Yaya DaCosta as Emergency Department Nurse April Sexton
 Torrey DeVitto as Dr. Natalie Manning, Emergency Medicine/Pediatrics Attending
 Brian Tee as LCDR Dr. Ethan Choi, Attending Emergency Physician/Chief of the ED.
 Marlyne Barrett as Maggie Campbell, RN, ED Charge Nurse
 S. Epatha Merkerson as Sharon Goodwin, Chief of Patient and Medical Services
 Oliver Platt as Dr. Daniel Charles, Chief of Psychiatry
 Dominic Rains as Dr. Crockett Marcel, Trauma surgeon

Recurring characters 
 Tehmina Sunny as Dr. Sabeena Virani, R&D Rep from Kender Pharmaceutical
 Roland Buck III as Dr. Noah Sexton, resident
 Jodi Kingsley as DCFS Officer Madeline Gastern
 Margaret Colin as Carol Conte
 Steven Weber as Dr. Dean Archer
 Nate Santana as Dr. James Lanik
 Brennan Brown as Dr. Samuel Abrams
 Charlie Farrell as Mark Barragan
 Benny Mora as Mike

Crossover guest stars 
 LaRoyce Hawkins as Officer Kevin Atwater
 Kara Killmer as Paramedic in Charge Sylvie Brett
 Joe Minoso as Firefighter Joe Cruz
 Hanako Greensmith as Paramedic Violet Mikami

Episodes

Production

Filming 
After shutting down in early March due to COVID-19, production on the new season picked up on Sept. 22. NBC revealed on September 29, 2020,  that the series took a two-week hiatus after a crew member tested positive for COVID-19. The positive result was discovered during rapid testing and the unnamed individual was immediately sent home. The temporary shutdown did not affect Med's Season 6 premiere or the production schedules for Chicago Fire and Chicago P.D..

Casting 
On September 22, 2020, Tehmina Sunny has been tapped for a multi-episode arc. On May 12, 2021, it was announced that longtime cast members Yaya DaCosta and Torrey DeVitto would depart the series at the end of the sixth season opting not to renew their contracts and new work opportunities.

Ratings

References

External links
 
 

2020 American television seasons
2021 American television seasons
Chicago Med seasons
Television productions postponed due to the COVID-19 pandemic
Television shows about the COVID-19 pandemic